The 1st constituency of Charente-Maritime (French: Première circonscription de la Charente-Maritime) is one of five electoral districts in the department of the same name, each of which returns one deputy to the French National Assembly in elections using the two-round system, with a run-off if no candidate receives more than 50% of the vote in the first round.

Since 2012, the constituency has been represented by Olivier Falorni, first as a Miscellaneous Left deputy and then as a deputy for the Radical Party of the Left. The constituency covers the city of La Rochelle and the Isle of Rhé.

Description
The constituency is made up of 11 pre-2015 cantons: those of Ars-en-Ré, La Rochelle-1, La Rochelle-2, La Rochelle-3, La Rochelle-4, La Rochelle-5, La Rochelle-6, La Rochelle-7, La Rochelle-8, La Rochelle-9, and Saint-Martin-de-Ré.

At the time of the 1999 census (which was the basis for the most recent redrawing of constituency boundaries, carried out in 2010) the 1st constituency had a total population of 130,679.

Deputies

Election results

2022 

 
 
 
 
 
 
 
|-
| colspan="8" bgcolor="#E9E9E9"|
|-

2017

2012 

|- style="background-color:#E9E9E9;text-align:center;"
! colspan="2" rowspan="2" style="text-align:left;" | Candidate
! rowspan="2" colspan="2" style="text-align:left;" | Party
! colspan="2" | 1st round
! colspan="2" | 2nd round
|- style="background-color:#E9E9E9;text-align:center;"
! width="75" | Votes
! width="30" | %
! width="75" | Votes
! width="30" | %
|-
| style="background-color:" |
| style="text-align:left;" | Olivier Falorni
| style="text-align:left;" | Miscellaneous Left
| DVG
| 
| 28.91%
| 
| 62.98%
|-
| style="background-color:" |
| style="text-align:left;" | Ségolène Royal
| style="text-align:left;" | Socialist Party
| PS
| 
| 32.03%
| 
| 37.02%
|-
| style="background-color:" |
| style="text-align:left;" | Sally Chadjaa
| style="text-align:left;" | Union for a Popular Movement
| UMP
| 
| 19.47%
| colspan="2" style="text-align:left;" |
|-
| style="background-color:" |
| style="text-align:left;" | Marie-Françoise de Lacoste Lareymondie
| style="text-align:left;" | Front National
| FN
| 
| 6.80%
| colspan="2" style="text-align:left;" |
|-
| style="background-color:" |
| style="text-align:left;" | Brigitte Desveaux
| style="text-align:left;" | Europe Ecology – The Greens
| EELV
| 
| 3.68%
| colspan="2" style="text-align:left;" |
|-
| style="background-color:" |
| style="text-align:left;" | Esther Memain
| style="text-align:left;" | Left Front
| FG
| 
| 3.40%
| colspan="2" style="text-align:left;" |
|-
| style="background-color:" |
| style="text-align:left;" | François Drageon
| style="text-align:left;" | Radical Party
| PRV
| 
| 1.88%
| colspan="2" style="text-align:left;" |
|-
| style="background-color:" |
| style="text-align:left;" | Arnaud Jaulin
| style="text-align:left;" | Centrist
| CEN
| 
| 1.79%
| colspan="2" style="text-align:left;" |
|-
| style="background-color:" |
| style="text-align:left;" | Michèle Coindeau
| style="text-align:left;" | Ecologist
| ECO
| 
| 0.89%
| colspan="2" style="text-align:left;" |
|-
| style="background-color:" |
| style="text-align:left;" | France Prenat
| style="text-align:left;" | Miscellaneous Right
| DVD
| 
| 0.43%
| colspan="2" style="text-align:left;" |
|-
| style="background-color:" |
| style="text-align:left;" | Antoine Colin
| style="text-align:left;" | Far Left
| EXG
| 
| 0.33%
| colspan="2" style="text-align:left;" |
|-
| style="background-color:" |
| style="text-align:left;" | Michel le Creff
| style="text-align:left;" | Miscellaneous Left
| DVG
| 
| 0.23%
| colspan="2" style="text-align:left;" |
|-
| style="background-color:" |
| style="text-align:left;" | Rodolphe Huguet
| style="text-align:left;" | Other
| AUT
| 
| 0.10%
| colspan="2" style="text-align:left;" |
|-
| style="background-color:" |
| style="text-align:left;" | Alain Ignacimouttou
| style="text-align:left;" | Miscellaneous Left
| DVG
| 
| 0.03%
| colspan="2" style="text-align:left;" |
|-
| colspan="8" style="background-color:#E9E9E9;"|
|- style="font-weight:bold"
| colspan="4" style="text-align:left;" | Total
| 
| 100%
| 
| 100%
|-
| colspan="8" style="background-color:#E9E9E9;"|
|-
| colspan="4" style="text-align:left;" | Registered voters
| 
| style="background-color:#E9E9E9;"|
| 
| style="background-color:#E9E9E9;"|
|-
| colspan="4" style="text-align:left;" | Blank/Void ballots
| 
| 0.58%
| 
| 2.07%
|-
| colspan="4" style="text-align:left;" | Turnout
| 
| 60.66%
| 
| 64.05%
|-
| colspan="4" style="text-align:left;" | Abstentions
| 
| 39.34%
| 
| 35.95%
|-
| colspan="8" style="background-color:#E9E9E9;"|
|- style="font-weight:bold"
| colspan="6" style="text-align:left;" | Result
| colspan="2" style="background-color:" |DVG GAIN FROM PS
|}

2007 

|- style="background-color:#E9E9E9;text-align:center;"
! colspan="2" rowspan="2" style="text-align:left;" | Candidate
! rowspan="2" colspan="2" style="text-align:left;" | Party
! colspan="2" | 1st round
! colspan="2" | 2nd round
|- style="background-color:#E9E9E9;text-align:center;"
! width="75" | Votes
! width="30" | %
! width="75" | Votes
! width="30" | %
|-
| style="background-color:" |
| style="text-align:left;" | Maxime Bono
| style="text-align:left;" | Socialist Party
| PS
| 
| 40.77%
| 
| 55.05%
|-
| style="background-color:" |
| style="text-align:left;" | Dominique Morvant
| style="text-align:left;" | Union for a Popular Movement
| UMP
| 
| 35.95%
| 
| 44.95%
|-
| style="background-color:" |
| style="text-align:left;" | Elisabeth Delorme-Blaizot
| style="text-align:left;" | Democratic Movement
| MoDem
| 
| 5.93%
| colspan="2" style="text-align:left;" |
|-
| style="background-color:" |
| style="text-align:left;" | Richard Douard
| style="text-align:left;" | Majorité Presidentielle
| Maj Pres
| 
| 2.93%
| colspan="2" style="text-align:left;" |
|-
| style="background-color:" |
| style="text-align:left;" | Gaëlle Mangin
| style="text-align:left;" | The Greens
| VEC
| 
| 2.83%
| colspan="2" style="text-align:left;" |
|-
| style="background-color:" |
| style="text-align:left;" | Jean-Marc de Lacoste Lareymondie
| style="text-align:left;" | Front National
| FN
| 
| 2.42%
| colspan="2" style="text-align:left;" |
|-
| style="background-color:" |
| style="text-align:left;" | Esther Memain
| style="text-align:left;" | Communist
| PCF
| 
| 2.30%
| colspan="2" style="text-align:left;" |
|-
| style="background-color:" |
| style="text-align:left;" | Patrick Vallee
| style="text-align:left;" | Far Left
| EXG
| 
| 1.78%
| colspan="2" style="text-align:left;" |
|-
| style="background-color:" |
| style="text-align:left;" | Serge Lavaud
| style="text-align:left;" | Movement for France
| MPF
| 
| 1.32%
| colspan="2" style="text-align:left;" |
|-
| style="background-color:" |
| style="text-align:left;" | Jean-Noël Debroise
| style="text-align:left;" | Ecologist
| ECO
| 
| 1.27%
| colspan="2" style="text-align:left;" |
|-
| style="background-color:" |
| style="text-align:left;" | Michelle Richard
| style="text-align:left;" | Hunting, Fishing, Nature, Traditions
| CPNT
| 
| 1.05%
| colspan="2" style="text-align:left;" |
|-
| style="background-color:" |
| style="text-align:left;" | Claire Melchiori
| style="text-align:left;" | Independent
| DIV
| 
| 0.64%
| colspan="2" style="text-align:left;" |
|-
| style="background-color:" |
| style="text-align:left;" | Antoine Colin
| style="text-align:left;" | Far Left
| EXG
| 
| 0.52%
| colspan="2" style="text-align:left;" |
|-
| style="background-color:" |
| style="text-align:left;" | Jacques Dumerc
| style="text-align:left;" | Far Left
| EXG
| 
| 0.30%
| colspan="2" style="text-align:left;" |
|-
| colspan="8" style="background-color:#E9E9E9;"|
|- style="font-weight:bold"
| colspan="4" style="text-align:left;" | Total
| 
| 100%
| 
| 100%
|-
| colspan="8" style="background-color:#E9E9E9;"|
|-
| colspan="4" style="text-align:left;" | Registered voters
| 
| style="background-color:#E9E9E9;"|
| 
| style="background-color:#E9E9E9;"|
|-
| colspan="4" style="text-align:left;" | Blank/Void ballots
| 
| 0.94%
| 
| 5.03%
|-
| colspan="4" style="text-align:left;" | Turnout
| 
| 61.77%
| 
| 64.13%
|-
| colspan="4" style="text-align:left;" | Abstentions
| 
| 38.23%
| 
| 35.87%
|-
| colspan="8" style="background-color:#E9E9E9;"|
|- style="font-weight:bold"
| colspan="6" style="text-align:left;" | Result
| colspan="2" style="background-color:" | PS HOLD
|}

2002 

 
 
 
 
 
 
 
 
 
|-
| colspan="8" bgcolor="#E9E9E9"|
|-

1997 

 
 
 
 
 
 
|-
| colspan="8" bgcolor="#E9E9E9"|
|-

References

Sources

 

 Notes and portraits of the French MPs under the Fifth Republic, French National Assembly
 2012 French legislative elections : Charente-Maritime's 1st constituency (first round and run-off), Minister of the Interior
 Constituencies of the Charente-Maritime, Atlaspol website

1